KJBI (100.1 FM, "100.1 The Eagle") is a radio station licensed to serve Fort Pierre, South Dakota.  The station is owned by Ingstad Family Media and licensed to James River Broadcasting. It airs a classic hits music format.

All four Pierre DRG Media Group (James River Broadcasting) stations share studios at 214 West Pleasant Drive, in Pierre.

The station was assigned the KJBI call letters by the Federal Communications Commission on August 2, 2007.

Programming 
Weekdays

 6 AM - 10 AM: David Burrell
 10 AM - 2 PM: Dave Williams
 2 - 7 PM: Chuck Hanson
 7 - 12 AM: Nights with Alice Cooper

Saturday

 10 AM - 2 PM: Corey Christianson
 2 - 7 PM: Brian Oakland
 7 PM - 12 AM: Nights with Alice Cooper

Sunday

 7-10 AM: American Top 40 with Casey Kasem (1970's)
 10 AM - 2 PM: Corey Christianson
 2-7 PM: Brian Oakland
 7-10 PM:

Former Programming
 The Bob & Tom Show

References

External links
KJBI official website

JBI
Classic hits radio stations in the United States
Radio stations established in 2008
Stanley County, South Dakota
2008 establishments in South Dakota